The duet free routine competition at 2013 World Aquatics Championships was held on July 23 with the preliminary round and the final on July 25.

Results
The preliminary round was held on 23 July at 09:00 and the final on 25 July at 19:00.

Green denotes finalists

References

Synchronised swimming at the 2013 World Aquatics Championships